Go FM may refer to:

 the former name of Radio One FM 94.3, a radio station in India,
 the current on-air brand name of CHGO-FM and CJGO-FM in the Canadian province of Quebec.
 the GoFM internet-only radio station, based in the United States and broadcasting since 2003.